Branch Creek may refer to:
 Branch Creek, Queensland, a locality in North Burnett Region, Queensland, Australia
 East Branch Perkiomen Creek, a creek in Pennsylvania, United States of America